The UK Singles Chart is one of many music charts compiled by the Official Charts Company that calculates the best-selling singles of the week in the United Kingdom. Before 2004, the chart was only based on the sales of physical singles. This list shows singles that peaked in the Top 10 of the UK Singles Chart during 1974, as well as singles which peaked in 1973 and 1975 but were in the top 10 in 1974. The entry date is when the single appeared in the top 10 for the first time (week ending, as published by the Official Charts Company, which is six days after the chart is announced).

One-hundred and thirty-nine singles were in the top ten in 1974. Ten singles from 1973 remained in the top 10 for several weeks at the beginning of the year, while "My Boy" by Elvis Presley, "Streets of London" by Ralph McTell and "Wombling Merry Christmas"/ by The Wombles were all released in 1974 but did not reach their peak until 1975. "The Show Must Go On" by Leo Sayer and "You Won't Find Another Fool Like Me" by The New Seekers featuring Lyn Paul were the singles from 1973 to reach their peak in 1974. Thirty-one artists scored multiple entries in the top 10 in 1974. ABBA, Barry White, Eric Clapton, Queen and Showaddywaddy were among the many artists who achieved their first UK charting top 10 single in 1974.

The 1973 Christmas number-one, "Merry Xmas Everybody" by Slade, remained at number-one for the first two weeks of 1974. The first new number-one single of the year was "You Won't Find Another Fool Like Me" by The New Seekers featuring Lyn Paul. Overall, twenty-one different singles peaked at number-one in 1974, with Mud (2) having the most singles hit that position.

Background

Multiple entries
One-hundred and thirty-nine singles charted in the top 10 in 1974, with one-hundred and twenty-eight singles reaching their peak this year.

Thirty-one artists scored multiple entries in the top 10 in 1974. Six artists shared the record for most top 10 hits in 1974 with four hit singles each. This included two solo artists, three rock bands and a novelty group from a successful children's television series. Gary Glitter's four top 10 singles spent a total of eighteen combined weeks in the top section of the chart. Two of these went to number-one - "I Love You Love Me Love", which ascended to the top spot at the end of 1973, and "Always Yours" in June. His other two entries were "Remember Me This Way", a number three peak in March, and "Oh Yes! You're Beautiful", which ranked a place higher in November. Fellow British singer Alvin Stardust counted February number one "Jealous Mind" among his chart hits. "Red Dress" peaked at number seven in May, "You You You" at number six in September, while "My Coo Ca Choo" reached number two late in 1973.

Scottish band The Bay City Rollers had four top ten entries themselves, "Shang-a-Lang" the best performing single at number two, one place higher than "Summerlove Sensation". "All of Me Loves All of You" made number four and "Remember (Sha-La-La-La)" was a number six hit. The Wombles appeared in the chart for the first time in 1974 and had four hit singles: "Wombling Song" reached number four, "Remember You're a Womble" also ranked in the top five at number three, "Banana Rock" made number nine and "Wombling Merry Christmas" rounded off the year at number two in the Christmas chart.

Mud and Slade also both counted a song with a Christmas feel in their total - the former had the Christmas number-one "Lonely This Christmas" while the latter charted with "Merry Xmas Everybody" at the finale of the previous year, both of which became festive staples in later years. Mud's other top 10 singles in 1974 were chart-topper and year-end best-selling single "Tiger Feet", "Rocket" (number six) and "The Cat Crept In" (number two). Slade for their part saw "Everyday" and "The Bangin' Man" rise to a high of number three, with "Far Far Away" going a spot higher.

The Glitter Band, Leo Sayer and The Stylistics all had three top 10 singles in 1974. Sayer's number two single "The Show Must Go On" reached its peak in January after first charting in 1973. His other two hit songs were "Long Tall Glasses" at number four and a cover of Roger Daltrey's "One Man Band" which made number six in June. The Glitter Band's best-performing single in 1974 was "Angel Face", rising to a number four peak in April. "Just for You" (number ten) and "Let's Get Together Again" (number eight) both reached the lower region of the top 10. American group The Stylistics were the final act with three top tens this year. "You Make Me Feel Brand New" was the most successful at number two, followed by "Rockin' Roll Baby" at number six and "Let's Put It All Together" in ninth position.

Barry White was one of a number of artists with two top-ten entries, including the number-one single "You're the First, the Last, My Everything". David Bowie, Diana Ross, The New Seekers, Sweet and Wings were among the other artists who had multiple top 10 entries in 1974.

Chart debuts
Forty-nine artists achieved their first top 10 single in 1974, either as a lead or featured artist. Of these, nine went on to record another hit single that year: Barry White, Cockney Rebel, Cozy Powell, George McCrae, Paper Lace, Queen, The Rubettes, Sparks and Terry Jacks. The Glitter Band peaked in the top ten with two more singles. The Wombles had three other entries in their breakthrough year.

The following table (collapsed on desktop site) does not include acts who had previously charted as part of a group and secured their first top 10 solo single.

Notes
Roy Wood of Wizzard scored his first and only solo top 10 in 1974 with "Forever" which peaked at number eight. His band had debuted with the number six entry "Ball Park Incident" in January 1973, with their most famous song "I Wish It Could Be Christmas Everyday" charting at number four in December 1973. The Glitter Band featured as uncredited backing singers for Gary Glitter early in his career (1972 to 1973), known under the name Glittermen but they charted in their own right with "Angel Face" in 1974.

Alan Price was a founding member of The Animals, best known for their song "House of the Rising Sun", and later formed the Alan Price Set. "Jarrow Song" became his sole top ten hit in his own right this year. Donny Osmond and sister Marie Osmond charted as a duo for the first time but both had previously had top 10 hits - Donny with the group The Osmonds and his solo work (including signature number one "Puppy Love"), Marie in 1973 with her solo single "Paper Roses". Andy Fairweather Low performed as a member of Amen Corner and Fair Weather before landing a top 10 entry, "Reggae Tune" reaching number ten.

Songs from films
"You're Sixteen" was a cover version of the Johnny Burnette song featured in American Graffiti in 1960. "I Get a Kick Out of You" was famously on the soundtrack to "Anything Goes" in 1934, performed by Cole Porter.

Best-selling singles
Mud had the best-selling single of the year with "Tiger Feet". The song spent seven weeks in the top 10 (including four weeks at number one) and was certified gold by the BPI. "Seasons in the Sun (Le moribond)" by Terry Jacks came in second place. Paper Lace's "Billy Don't Be a Hero", "When Will I See You Again" from The Three Degrees and "Rock Your Baby" by George McCrae made up the top five. Singles by David Essex, Charles Aznavour, Carl Douglas, Ken Boothe and The Rubettes were also in the top ten best-selling singles of the year.

Top-ten singles
Key

Entries by artist

The following table shows artists who achieved two or more top 10 entries in 1974, including singles that reached their peak in 1973 or 1975. The figures include both main artists and featured artists, while appearances on ensemble charity records are also counted for each artist. The total number of weeks an artist spent in the top ten in 1974 is also shown.

Notes

 "Wombling Merry Christmas" reached its peak of number two on 4 January 1975 (week ending).
 "Streets of London" reached its peak of number two on 11 January 1975 (week ending).
 "Paper Roses" re-entered the top 10 at number 8 on 19 January 1974 (week ending).
 "I Get a Little Sentimental Over You" and "You Won't Find Another Fool Like Me" were both credited to The New Seekers featuring Lyn Paul by the Official Charts Company because she was singing lead vocals for the first time.
 "Waterloo" was Sweden's winning entry at the Eurovision Song Contest in 1974.
 "Break the Rules" re-entered the top 10 at number 10 on 8 June 1974 (week ending).
 "Go (Before You Break My Heart)" was Italy's entry at the Eurovision Song Contest in 1974.
 "I See a Star" was the Netherlands' entry at the Eurovision Song Contest in 1974.
 "She" was the theme song to the television series Seven Faces of Woman.
 "Young Girl" originally peaked at number 1 on its initial release in 1968. In 1974, the song was re-released as part of a CBS Records series entitled "Hall of Fame Hits".
 "If You Go Away" re-entered the top 10 at number 10 on 3 August 1974 (week ending).
 "What Becomes of the Brokenhearted" originally peaked at number 8 on its initial release in 1966.
 "No, Honestly" was the theme song to the LWT television comedy series No, Honestly.
 Figure includes single that peaked in 1973.
 Figure includes single that peaked in 1975.
 Figure includes single that first charted in 1973 but peaked in 1974.
 Figure includes a top 10 hit with the group The Osmonds.
 Figure includes appearance on The New Seekers' "I Get a Little Sentimental Over You" and "You Won't Find Another Fool Like Me".

See also
1974 in British music
List of number-one singles from the 1970s (UK)

References
General

Specific

External links
1974 singles chart archive at the Official Charts Company (click on relevant week)

Top 10 singles
United Kingdom
1974